The 1924 Southern Conference men's basketball tournament took place from February 28–March 4, 1924, at Municipal Auditorium in Atlanta, Georgia. The North Carolina Tar Heels won their second Southern Conference title, led by head coach Norman Shepard.

Bracket

* Overtime game

Championship

All-Southern tournament team

See also
List of Southern Conference men's basketball champions

References

Tournament
Southern Conference men's basketball tournament
Southern Conference men's basketball tournament
Southern Conference men's basketball tournament
Southern Conference men's basketball tournament